Đorđe Ivelja (also transliterated Djordje Ivelja; born 30 June 1984) is a Serbian professional footballer who plays as a midfielder.

Club career
Ivelja made his First League of FR Yugoslavia debut with OFK Beograd in 2001, aged 17. He spent seven years there, including several loan spells with lower-tier clubs. In early 2009, Ivelja moved to Romanian side Rapid București. He made 11 league appearances for the club, before leaving at the end of the year.

On 12 January 2017, Ivelja joined Bulgarian First League side Montana, signing a short-term contract. He left the club in June. In the summer of 2017, Ivelja joined Swiss club NK Pajde Möhlin.

International career
Ivelja represented Serbia at the 2007 UEFA European Under-21 Championship, winning the silver medal.

Statistics

Honours
Napredak Kruševac
Serbian First League: 2015–16

References

External links
 
 
 
 PrvaLiga profile
 Srbijafudbal profile
 Ivelja Đorđe at Utakmica.rs 

1984 births
Living people
Serbian footballers
Serbia under-21 international footballers
Association football midfielders
Serbian expatriate footballers
Serbian expatriate sportspeople in Romania
Serbian expatriate sportspeople in Slovenia
Serbian expatriate sportspeople in Uzbekistan
Serbian expatriate sportspeople in Bulgaria
Serbian expatriate sportspeople in Switzerland
Expatriate footballers in Romania
Expatriate footballers in Slovenia
Expatriate footballers in Uzbekistan
Expatriate footballers in Bulgaria
Expatriate footballers in Switzerland
OFK Beograd players
NK Olimpija Ljubljana (2005) players
FK Napredak Kruševac players
FC Rapid București players
FK ČSK Čelarevo players
FK Javor Ivanjica players
FK Mačva Šabac players
FK Mladi Radnik players
FK Veternik players
FC Montana players
Serbian First League players
Serbian SuperLiga players
Liga I players
Slovenian PrvaLiga players
First Professional Football League (Bulgaria) players
People from Bačka Palanka